B3: Battle by the Bay, the B4 Championships, and the B5 Championships were the first three instances of the open fighting game event that is now known as the annual Evolution Championship Series. B3 was created by Tom and Tony Cannon, Joey Cuellar, and Seth Killian, and was held in an arcade hall in Sunnyvale, California in 1996. B4 and B5 were held in Folsom, California in 2000 and 2001 respectively, and the tournament was renamed Evolution in 2002. The three tournaments were entirely focused on the Street Fighter and Capcom Versus video game franchises.

Though the Battle by the Bay mainly drew in competitors from the Street Fighter tournament scenes that had coalesced in various cities throughout the United States in the mid-1990s, the tournaments also attracted international challengers early on.

B3: Battle by the Bay

During the mid-1990s, a Street Fighter II tournament scene had coalesced in various cities across the United States. The Golfland arcade hall in Sunnyvale, California was one of the hottest spots for competition in the country, with rivalries happening among various player groups, in particular between Northern and Southern California players. Players were also finding each other and discussing strategies through the internet on message boards. The Battle by the Bay was conceived in order to quell debate over who was the best Street Fighter player in the country.

B3: Battle by the Bay was organized by Tom "inkblot" Cannon, Tony "Ponder" Cannon, Joey "MrWizard" Cuellar, and Seth "S-Kill" Killian, and held in the Golfland arcade hall in Sunnyvale, California in 1996. The tournament had 40 contenders mostly from the United States, though B3 also featured players from Canada and Kuwait. Tom Cannon noted that the international interest in B3 had a big impact on him. Luke Winkie of The Atlantic described B3 as "a snapshot of the brilliant optimism of esports during its earliest days," noting the significant black American presence in the young fighting game community, and therefore the racial diversity at the event.

Alex Valle made his first major appearance at the Battle by the Bay, defeating John Choi in the Street Fighter Alpha 2 grand finals. To win the tournament, Valle revealed an unblockable combo he had discovered, which was dubbed the "Valle CC."

Results

B4 Championships
The B4 Street Fighter Championships were held on July 15–16, 2000, in Folsom, California. Like B3 four years earlier, B4 featured a Super Street Fighter II Turbo and Street Fighter Alpha 2, but B4 also introduced several new Capcom fighting games to the roster: Street Fighter Alpha 3, Street Fighter III: 3rd Strike, and Marvel vs. Capcom 2: New Age of Heroes. The newly released Marvel vs. Capcom 2 was the first non-Street Fighter game to be included, and a precedent for the tournament to branch out to other games. The Capcom Versus series has since had a large presence in the Battle of the Bay and Evolution Championship Series events.

The five winners of the Street Fighter Alpha 3 tournament at B4 were flown to Japan to partake in 5v5 exhibition match between the top-ranking American and Japanese players. Here, Alex Valle would face off against Daigo Umehara for the first time. The lead up to this exhibition match was subject to a documentary directed by Peter Kang, titled Bang the Machine.

Results

B5 Championships
Held in August 2001 in Folsom, California, the B5 Championships was attended by a much larger international crowd, particularly from Japan. Capcom vs. SNK: Millennium Fight 2000 made its introduction in the tournament roster at B5, and Marvel vs. Capcom 2 was again a headliner of the event, being described by TechTV as "the hottest arcade fighting game of the season."

Results

References

Evolution Championship Series
1996 in esports
2000 in esports
2001 in esports
1996 in sports in California
2000 in sports in California
2001 in sports in California